Dietrich Unkrodt (25 August 1934 – 26 June 2006) was a German tubist and double bass player. He was employed at the Meiningen Theatre and moved to the Komische Oper Berlin in 1960, where he remained until 2000.

Life 
Born in Prudnik, Unkrodt was one of the pioneers of solo tuba music in Germany. Joachim Gruner composed a concerto for tuba and orchestra for him, which he premiered in 1978 with the orchestra of the Komische Oper Berlin under the direction of Joachim Willert.

He performed other solo works as a soloist at home and abroad as well as in radio productions.

Together with the pianist and composer Hannes Zerbe, he devoted himself to free jazz since 1980 in the duo Zerbe-Unkrodt. He was also a member of the Hannes Zerbe Blechband.

Unkrodt taught since 1978 as a professor at the Hochschule für Musik "Hanns Eisler", seit 2003 auch an der Universität der Künste Berlin. He was a juror at various national and international competitions.

Unkrodt died in Cottbus at the age of 71. He is buried in the Dorotheenstadt Cemetery in Berlin-Mitte.

References

External links 
 
 

German classical tubists
Jazz tubists
Academic staff of the Hochschule für Musik Hanns Eisler Berlin
Academic staff of the Berlin University of the Arts
1934 births
2006 deaths
People from Prudnik